Peregrins were an alternative rock band.  Bassist Fred Smith was a founding member of Blondie and recorded with Television during that band's critical peak in the late-1970s.

Personnel
Deirdre Steinschneider, lead vocals
Jeffrey Dresher, guitars
Julius Klepacz, drums
Eve Moon, guitar and backing vocals
Fred Smith, bass

Discography
Peregrins LP/CD (MCA 6288) - 1989
True Believer 12" vinyl/CD Single (MCA 8961) - 1989

Charts
True Believer peaked at number 15 on college radio in August, 1989.

References

Alternative rock groups from New York (state)